The women's 10 metre air rifle shooting event at the 2011 Pan American Games will be held on October 17 at the Pan American Shooting Polygon in Guadalajara. The defending Pan American Games champion is Eglys De La Cruz of Cuba.

The event consisted of two rounds: a qualifier and a final. In the qualifier, each shooter fired 40 shots with an air rifle at 10 metres distance from the standing position. Scores for each shot were in increments of 1, with a maximum score of 10.

The top 8 shooters in the qualifying round moved on to the final round. There, they fired an additional 10 shots. These shots scored in increments of .1, with a maximum score of 10.9. The total score from all 50 shots was used to determine final ranking.

With the win Emily Caruso of the United States qualifies Canada a quota spot for the women's 10 metre air rifle event at the 2012 Summer Olympics in London, Great Britain.

Schedule
All times are Central Standard Time (UTC-6).

Records
The existing world and Pan American Games records were as follows.

Results

Qualification round
29 athletes from 16 countries competed.

Final

References

Shooting at the 2011 Pan American Games
Pan